The 1993 Eastern College Athletic Conference baseball tournament was held from May 19 through 23 at Municipal Stadium in Waterbury, Connecticut.  It matched teams from the Eastern College Athletic Conference, a loose arrangement of college baseball teams from the northeastern United States at the end of the 1993 NCAA Division I baseball season.  Occurring after the start of the 1993 NCAA Division I baseball tournament, the event provided additional playing opportunities for teams already eliminated from other postseason play.   won the championship.

Bracket

References

Eastern College Athletic Conference baseball
ECAC Tournament
ECAC baseball tournament